Tagetes microglossa is a Mesoamerican species of marigold in the family Asteraceae. It grows in Central America, Colombia, and Ecuador, as well as in central and southern Mexico, from Jalisco to Chiapas.

Tagetes microglossa is a hairless annual herb up to 30 cm (12 inches) tall. Leaves are pinnately compound with 7-11 leaflets. The plant produces a few flower heads are yellow, in a flat-topped array, each head containing 3-5 ray florets surrounding numerous disc florets.

References

External links
line drawing from Flora of Panama

microglossa
Flora of Mexico
Flora of Central America
Flora of South America
Plants described in 1845
Taxa named by George Bentham